Brutus is the first full-length studio album by Norwegian hard rock, heavy blues rock band Brutus. It was released on 16 April 2010. It came in two versions: digipak CD (Transubstans Records) and vinyl LP, released by Svart Records. The album received good reviews and critical acclaim.

Track listing
All songs written by Brutus.
 "Hypnotized" - 5:25
 "Solution" - 4:44
 "Feel Free" - 4:44
 "Hey Mama" - 4:32
 "(The) Golden Town" - 5:35
 "Spirit of Time" - 7:25
 "Swedish Lady" - 4:28
 "Swamp City Blues" - 7:31
 "Stagnant Pool" (Leaf Hound cover) LP version only bonus track) - 3:46

Personnel

Brutus
Karl Johan Forsberg: Guitars
Kim Molander: Guitars
Christian "Krille" Hellqvist: Bass
Nils Joakim Stenby: Vocals
Knut-Ole Mathisen: Drums, Percussion

Additional musicians
Henryk Lipp: Piano
Axel Lennart Söderberg: Backing vocals

References

2010 debut albums
Brutus (Norwegian band) albums